Espoir Football Club is an association football club based in Rusizi, Rwanda. The team currently competes in the Azam Rwanda Premier League, and plays its home games at the Rusizi Stadium.

References

External links
Soccerway
newtimes.co.rw

Football clubs in Rwanda